Kelly Johnson (born September 27, 1961) is a Canadian ice dancer. With partner Kris Barber, she is the 1981 and 1982 Canadian silver medallist and 1978 World junior silver medallist. With partner John Thomas, she placed 12th at the 1984 Winter Olympics. She is currently a figure skating coach and choreographer in Barrie, Ontario.

Competitive highlights
(with Thomas)

(with Barber)

 J = Junior level

References

 
 
 

1961 births
Living people
Canadian female ice dancers
Figure skaters at the 1984 Winter Olympics
Olympic figure skaters of Canada
World Junior Figure Skating Championships medalists
Sportspeople from Thunder Bay